United Association for Labor Education (UALE) is an international association for post-secondary, community, union and associated labor educators based in Chicago, Illinois.

UALE was founded on April 15, 2000, in Milwaukee, Wisconsin, through the merger of the university and College Labor Education Association and Workers' Education Local 189 (an affiliate of the Communications Workers of America, AFL–CIO).

The goals of the UALE are to promote the development and professionalization of labor education, and to advocate for increased support of labor education programs in higher education and the international labor movement.

UALE co-publishes, with West Virginia University, Labor Studies Journal, a multi-disciplinary publication about workers and labor organizations.

External links
 United Association for Labor Education
 Labor Studies Journal

Professional associations based in the United States
Organizations established in 2000
Organizations based in Chicago
Labor studies organizations